Sverre Offenberg Løberg (4 April 1905 – 30 July 1976) was a Norwegian politician for the Labour Party.

He was elected to the Norwegian Parliament from the Market towns of Telemark and Aust-Agder counties in 1934, and was re-elected on five occasions.

Løberg was born in Skien and was deputy mayor of Skien city from 1925 to 1928, and later served as a member in the period 1934–1937.

Selected works
Det jeg husker best (1966)

References

1905 births
1976 deaths
Labour Party (Norway) politicians
Members of the Storting
Sachsenhausen concentration camp survivors
Norwegian World War II memoirists
20th-century Norwegian writers
20th-century Norwegian politicians
Politicians from Skien